Turtle River State Park is a public recreation area occupying  on the Turtle River,  north of the community of Arvilla in Grand Forks County, North Dakota. Park activities include camping, cross-country skiing, fishing, hiking, and mountain biking.

History
Following its establishment in 1934, the state park saw development by the Civilian Conservation Corps. CCC projects included building bridges, roads, and footpaths as well as various stone and log buildings including a bathhouse that was later transformed into the CCC Memorial Picnic Shelter, which is still in use.

References

External links

Turtle River State Park North Dakota Parks and Recreation Department
Turtle River State Park Map North Dakota Parks and Recreation

Civilian Conservation Corps in North Dakota
State parks of North Dakota
Protected areas established in 1934
1934 establishments in North Dakota
Protected areas of Grand Forks County, North Dakota